Loose Cannons is a 1990 American action comedy film written by Richard Matheson, Richard Christian Matheson and Bob Clark, who also directed the film. The film stars Gene Hackman as a hard-nosed cop who is teamed up with a detective with multiple-personality disorder, played by Dan Aykroyd, to uncover a long-lost Nazi sex tape, featuring Adolf Hitler, which would jeopardize the political future of the German chancellor-elect. The theme song features vocals by Katey Sagal and Aykroyd.

Upon release by Tri-Star Pictures on February 9, 1990, the film was a critical and financial bomb, bringing in only $5.5 million worldwide on a $15 million budget.

Plot
A film is found that features young German officer Kirk von Metz sleeping with Adolf Hitler. Years later, von Metz, running for chancellor of West Germany, arranges for anyone who has seen the film to be murdered. The killings take place in the Washington D.C. area, and Metropolitan Police officers MacArthur "Mac" Stern and Ellis Fielding are sent to investigate the crimes.

Ellis suffers from a dissociative identity disorder stemming from a disastrous undercover drug sting, which is aggravated when he is confronted with violence. This results in several episodes where he blacks out and assumes the personalities of popular culture characters, including Popeye, Captain Kirk and the Road Runner.

Mac and Ellis attempt to track down the film through pornographer Harry "The Hippo" Gutterman, who informs them that to do so they need to get to New York City. They decide to take a train, but first must evade a team of FBI agents led by Bob Smiley, who must shield von Metz from embarrassment by intercepting the film before it goes public. They all meet up at Washington's Union Station, where Mac and Ellis trick Smiley and his team into boarding the New York-bound train they originally intended to take, while they jump off and hop onto one on the opposite track bound for Cleveland instead. While on board that train, Mac notices another undercover team that has been trailing them, which is revealed to be led by Rebecca "Riva" Lowengrin, a Mossad agent assigned to the Embassy of Israel in Washington, D.C.

After surviving a helicopter attack on the train by Nazi sympathizers, Mac, Ellis and Gutterman jump off a bridge into a river and eventually make their way to New York. En route, Ellis confides in Mac his fear that if another episode occurs it could prove irrevocable, which would make him a dangerous liability, and wishes to return to the Benedictine Monks who originally looked after him during his recovery. Mac, however, reiterates his belief in Ellis and shows him that he is strong enough to persevere, move forward and recover; that the past is irrelevant and that the present and the future are what matter. Consequently, Ellis regains his courage and the will to fight. Mac finds the film in a locker on one of the upper levels of Grand Central Terminal and, during an exchange of gunfire with more Nazis, throws the film to Riva, who has just arrived on the main concourse below. It is screened that same evening during a speech that von Metz delivers. Mac, Ellis and Gutterman all suffer gunshot wounds and, as the movie ends, are seen recuperating in the same hospital. Mac jokes to Ellis that he is converting to Judaism that evening in order to move to Israel to join the Mossad but is uncomfortable about undergoing circumcision. Ellis catches on to the humor and points out that the reason that they work together so well as partners is because technically, Mac is crazier than he is.

Cast
 Gene Hackman as Detective MacArthur 'Mac' Stern
 Dan Aykroyd as Detective Ellis Fielding
 Dom DeLuise as Harry 'The Hippo' Gutterman
 Ronny Cox as Bob Smiley
 Nancy Travis as Agent Rebecca 'Riva' Lowengrin
 Paul Koslo as Grimmer
 Dick O'Neill as Captain 
 Robert Prosky as Kirk Von Metz
 Jan Triska as Steckler
 Leon Rippy as Weskit
 Robert Elliott as Monseigner
 David Alan Grier as Drummond
 S. Epatha Merkerson as Officer Rachel
 John Finn as Cop
 Reg E. Cathey as Willie
 Herb Armstrong as 'Cheshire Cat'
 Robert Dickman as 'White Rabbit'
 Brad Greenquist as Embassy Officer

J. T. Walsh was originally cast as Grimmer, completing two days of filming, before Dan Aykroyd learned he had been in the cast of the John Belushi biopic Wired.  He reportedly had Walsh fired over his participation in the other film, which Aykroyd had opposed.

Reception

Box office
The film was released on February 9, 1990 and grossed $2,239,830 on its opening weekend, ranking #5 at the box office. Its widest release was 1,214 theaters. It only played in cinemas for two weeks, where it grossed $5,585,154 worldwide. On a budget of $15 million, the film ended up a box office flop.

Critical response
Loose Cannons received universally negative reviews from critics, and has been declared one of the worst films in the early 1990s. It has a rare 0% rating on Rotten Tomatoes based on 18 reviews. Audiences surveyed by CinemaScore gave the film a grade "B−" on scale of A to F.

Vincent Canby, in his review for The New York Times, stated: "Mr. Hackman and Mr. Aykroyd deserve much better. They really do. Each gives a thoroughly professional performance that is consistently undercut by the direction of Mr. Clark."

Variety stated that "Dan Aykroyd's dexterous multipersonality schtick is the only redeeming feature of this chase-heavy comedy." Hal Hinson commented that "Hackman mostly just stands around watching Aykroyd run through his exertions with the look of a man who has something unspeakable on the sole of his shoe" in his review for The Washington Post. Gene Siskel and Roger Ebert gave the film a "Two Thumbs Down" vote on At the Movies, and called it "the cop-buddy comedy that hits new lows in an undisputed field."

In May 2013, Calgary Police investigated after footage from the film was found in a landfill by a worker, who mistook it for evidence of an actual murder. It was later noticed that Aykroyd was in the frame, and the police contacted his agent who, after some searching, stated that it was a section from this movie. TMZ reported that after the incident Aykroyd said, "The movie should have been left in the landfill where it belongs."

References

External links
 

1990 films
1990s crime comedy films
American crime comedy films
American buddy cop films
1990s English-language films
Films scored by Paul Zaza
Films directed by Bob Clark
American police detective films
Films with screenplays by Richard Matheson
TriStar Pictures films
Cultural depictions of Adolf Hitler
1990 comedy films
Films with screenplays by Richard Christian Matheson
Films about mental health
Films shot in New York City
Films shot in North Carolina
Films shot in Washington, D.C.
1990s American films